The 2003 Stratford-on-Avon District Council election took place on 1 May 2003 to elect members of Stratford-on-Avon District Council in Warwickshire, England. One third of the council was up for election and the Conservative Party gained overall control of the council from no overall control.

After the election, the composition of the council was
Conservative 27
Liberal Democrat 22
Independent 3
Labour 1

Campaign
Before the election the Conservatives were one seats short of having a majority on the council with 26 seats, as compared to 22 for the Liberal Democrats, 2 Labour and 3 independents. 16 seats were contested in the election with the Liberal Democrats defending the most seats.

Council tax levels were the major issue in the election with the Liberal Democrats attacking plans for a 58% increase, which they said was mostly due to waste and poor decisions by the council. However the Conservatives defended the rise, blaming it on an insufficient grant from the national government and on the previous Liberal Democrat administration for using cash balances to keep levels artificially low. The election also saw four independent candidates standing in Stratford wards in opposition to the council tax rise.

Election result
The results saw the Conservatives regain control of the council, after the election saw 5 seats changes hands. They made a net gain of 1 seat at the expense of Labour who were reduced to only 1 seat on the council after losing in Southam ward. The election in Stratford Avenue and New Town saw the closest result with independent Keith Lloyd, standing in protest at council tax levels, defeating Liberal Democrat Bill Lowe by 1 vote. However the Liberal Democrats ended with the same number of seats, with their 2 gains including a surprise win in Stockton and Napton. Turnout in the election varied from a low of 27% to a high of 51%, but overall fell from 45% in 2002 to only 35%. This was despite including 3,000 voters who had used a trial e-voting internet system.

Ward results

References

2003 English local elections
2003
2000s in Warwickshire